Greek life can refer to:
 Culture of Greece
 Fraternities and sororities at colleges and universities